Juan Muñoz may refer to:

Arts and entertainment
Juan Quintero Muñoz (1903–1980), Spanish composer
Juan Muñoz (sculptor) (1953–2001), Spanish sculptor
Juan Antonio Muñoz (born 1965), Spanish comedian
Juan Jacinto Muñoz Rengel (born 1974), Spanish novelist

Sports

Association football (soccer)
Juan Muñoz (footballer, born 1912), Chilean footballer
Juan Carlos Muñoz (1919–2009), Argentine footballer
Juan Carlos Muñoz (Chilean footballer) (born 1978)
Juan Muñoz (footballer, born 1985), Spanish footballer
Juan Muñoz (footballer, born 1995), Spanish footballer

Other sports
Juan Muñoz (boxer) (1907–1972), Spanish boxer
Juan Francisco Muñoz (born 1959), Spanish handball player
Oscar Múñoz (baseball) (Juan Oscar Múñoz, born 1969), Major League Baseball pitcher
Juan Manuel Muñoz Díaz (born 1969), Spanish dressage rider

Others
Juan Muñoz Bejarano (1610-1670), Spanish military officer and politician
Juan Muñoz Gadea (1634-?), Spanish soldier and governor
Juan Muñoz y Peralta (1695-1746), Spanish physician
Juan Bautista Muñoz (1745–1799), Spanish philosopher
Juan Carlos Muñoz Márquez (born 1950), Mexican politician
Juan José Muñoz (1950–2013), Argentine businessman

See also
Juan Carlos Muñoz (disambiguation)